Vale of Glamorgan is a constituency represented in the House of Commons of the UK Parliament since 2010 by Alun Cairns, a Conservative.

It is a bellwether constituency, having been won by the party with a plurality of seats in every general election since the seat was created in 1983.

Boundaries

1983–2010: The Borough of Vale of Glamorgan wards of Baruc, Buttrills, Cadoc, Castleland, Court, Cowbridge, Dinas Powys, Dyfan, Gibbonsdown, Illtyd, Llandow, Llantwit Major, Peterson-super-Ely, Rhoose, St Athan, Sully, and Wenvoe.

2010–present: The Vale of Glamorgan County Borough electoral divisions of Baruc, Buttrills, Cadoc, Castleland, Court, Cowbridge, Dinas Powys, Dyfan, Gibbonsdown, Illtyd, Llandow and Ewenny, Llantwit Major, Peterston-super-Ely, Rhoose, St Athan, St Bride's Major, and Wenvoe.

This marginal constituency to the west of Cardiff takes in the Labour-voting seaside resort of Barry and a number of Conservative villages and small towns, such as Cowbridge. There have been some close shaves for both parties here in the past: Conservative Walter Sweeney got home by a mere 19 votes in 1992; and John Smith (the namesake of the late previous Labour leader) had a majority of under 2,000 in 2005. John Smith stood down from Parliament due to ill health, and the seat went Conservative at the 2010 election.

Sully ward was transferred to Cardiff South and Penarth in 2010.

Members of Parliament

Elections

Elections in the 1980s

Elections in the 1990s

Elections in the 2000s

Elections in the 2010s

 

Of the 294 rejected ballots:
255 were either unmarked or it was uncertain who the vote was for.
37 voted for more than one candidate.
2 had writing or mark by which the voter could be identified.

See also
 Vale of Glamorgan (Senedd constituency)
 List of parliamentary constituencies in South Glamorgan
 List of parliamentary constituencies in Wales

Notes

References

External links 
Politics Resources (Election results from 1922 onwards)
Electoral Calculus (Election results from 1955 onwards)
2017 Election House Of Commons Library 2017 Election report
A Vision Of Britain Through Time (Constituency elector numbers)

Parliamentary constituencies in South Wales
Constituencies of the Parliament of the United Kingdom established in 1983
Politics of the Vale of Glamorgan